Jerry Dean Quick (born December 30, 1963) is a former American football offensive tackle who played one game in the National Football League (NFL) for the Pittsburgh Steelers. He attended college at Kansas, Butler CC, Des Moines Area CC, Iowa State, and Wichita State.

Early life and education
Quick was born on December 30, 1963, in Anthony, Kansas. He attended Chaparral High School in Harper County, where he was a three-time all-state selection. After graduating from high school, Quick committed to the University of Kansas, but found the campus not to his liking and transferred to Butler Community College after one summer at Kansas. He played two seasons at Butler CC, and in the second was named All-Kansas Jayhawk Community College Conference (KJCCC). He was recruited to Kansas State, and was described as the "biggest of the K-State recruits."

Quick ended up transferring to Des Moines Area Community College in 1985, with the intention of attending Iowa State later in the year. Quick was listed as number two on the Iowa State depth chart, but decided he did not want to play for them as he and coach Jim Criner did not get along.

After learning former Butler CC teammate Rick Remsberg and coach Fayne Henson were at Wichita State, Quick became interested and transferred there. Despite having joined just three weeks before the start of the season, Quick learned the playbook and became Wichita State's top offensive tackle, starting in all 11 games. At the end of the year, he was named second-team all-conference.

After finishing his senior year in 1985, Quick was named first-team All-Missouri Valley Conference (MVC) by both Associated Press (AP) and United Press International (UPI).

Professional career
After going unselected in the 1986 NFL Draft, Quick was signed by the Pittsburgh Steelers as an undrafted free agent. He was placed on the season-ending injured reserve on August 20. In , Quick appeared in one game, a week six win against the Indianapolis Colts.

References

1963 births
Living people
Players of American football from Kansas
American football offensive tackles
Kansas Jayhawks football players
Butler Grizzlies football players
Iowa State Cyclones football players
Wichita State Shockers football players
Pittsburgh Steelers players
National Football League replacement players